Ojibwe is an indigenous language of North America from the Algonquian language family. Ojibwe is one of the largest Native American languages north of Mexico in terms of number of speakers and is characterized by a series of dialects, some of which differ significantly. The dialects of Ojibwe are spoken in Canada from southwestern Quebec, through Ontario, Manitoba and parts of Saskatchewan, with outlying communities in Alberta and British Columbia, and in the United States from Michigan through Wisconsin and Minnesota, with a number of communities in North Dakota and Montana, as well as migrant groups in Kansas and Oklahoma.

The absence of linguistic or political unity among Ojibwe-speaking groups is associated with the relative autonomy of the regional dialects of Ojibwe. There is no single dialect that is considered the most prestigious or most prominent, and no standard writing system used to represent all dialects. Ojibwe dialects have been written in numerous ways over a period of several centuries, with the development of different written traditions reflecting a range of influences from the orthographic practices of other languages.

Writing systems associated with particular dialects have been developed by adapting the Latin script, usually the English or French orthographies. A widely used Roman character-based writing system is the double vowel system, attributed to Charles Fiero. The double vowel system is quickly gaining popularity among language teachers in the United States and Canada because of its ease of use.

A syllabic writing system not related to English or French writing is used by some Ojibwe speakers in northern Ontario and Manitoba. Development of the original form of Canadian Aboriginal syllabics is credited to missionary James Evans around 1840.

The Great Lakes Algonquian syllabics are based on French orthography with letters organized into syllables. It was primarily used by speakers of Fox, Potawatomi, and Winnebago, but there is indirect evidence of use by speakers of Chippewa ("Southwestern Ojibwe").

Anishinaabewibii'iganan

Anishinaabewibii'iganan can refer to the body of Ojibwe writings found as petroglyphs, on story-hides, and on Midewiwin wiigwaasabakoon, similar to the Mi'kmaw Suckerfish script. Not much is known to academia regarding these "hieroglyphics" or glyphs, though there are said to be several Ojibwe elders who still know the meanings of many of the symbols. As their content is considered sacred, however, very little information about them has been revealed.

In treaty negotiations with the British, the treaty-signing chiefs would often mark an "X" for their signature and then use the Wiigwaasabak character representing their doodem. Today, Ojibwe artists commonly incorporate motifs found in the Wiigwaasabak to instill "Native Pride." 

The term itself: "Anishinaabewibii'iganan", simply means Ojibwe/Anishinaabe or "Indian" writings and can encompass a far larger meaning than only the historical pictographic script. Indeed, Anishinaabewibii'iganan may describe the pictographic script better since its connections with non-Anishinaabe or -Ojibwe nations extend deeply.

Romanized Ojibwe systems

Modern Latin alphabets
The different systems used to write Ojibwe are typically distinguished by their representation of key features of the Ojibwe inventory of sounds. Differences include: the representation of vowel length, the representation of nasal vowels, the representation of fortis and lenis consonants; and the representation of consonants which require an International Phonetic Alphabet (IPA) symbol that differs significantly from the conventional alphabetic symbol.

Double vowel system
The double vowel orthography is an adaptation of the linguistically oriented system found in publications such as Leonard Bloomfield's Eastern Ojibwa. Its name arises from the use of doubled vowel symbols to represent long vowels that are paired with corresponding short vowels; a variant in which long vowels are represented with a macron (ˉ) over short vowels is also reported for several publications in the early 1970s. Development of the double vowel system is attributed to Charles Fiero. At a conference held to discuss the development of a common Ojibwe orthography, Ojibwe language educators agreed that the double vowel system was a preferred choice but recognized that other systems were also used and preferred in some locations. The double vowel system is widely favored among language teachers in the United States and Canada and is taught in a program for Ojibwe language teachers.

The double vowel orthography is used to write several dialects of Ojibwe spoken in the circum-Great Lakes area. Significant publications in Chippewa (Southwestern Ojibwe)  include a widely used dictionary and a collection of texts. The same system with minor differences is used for several publications in the Ottawa and Eastern Ojibwe dialects (see below Ottawa-Eastern Ojibwe double vowel system).

One of the goals underlying the double vowel orthography is promoting standardization of Ojibwe writing so that language learners are able to read and write in a consistent way. By comparison, folk phonetic spelling approaches to writing Ottawa based on less systematic adaptations of written English or French are more variable and idiosyncratic and do not always make consistent use of alphabetic letters.

Letters of the English alphabet substitute for specialized phonetic symbols, in conjunction with orthographic conventions unique to Ojibwe. The system embodies two principles: (1) alphabetic letters from the English alphabet are used to write Ojibwe but with Ojibwe sound values; (2) the system is phonemic in nature in that each letter or letter combination indicates its basic sound value and does not reflect all the phonetic detail that occurs. Accurate pronunciation thus cannot be learned without consulting a fluent speaker.

The long vowels  are paired with the short vowels , and are written with double symbols  that correspond to the single symbols used for the short vowels . The long vowel  does not have a corresponding short vowel, and is written with a single .

The short vowels are: .

The long vowels are: .

They most commonly occur in the final syllable of nouns with diminutive suffixes or words with a diminutive connotation. Orthographically they are represented differently in word-final position as opposed to word-internally.

The examples in the table below are from the Ottawa dialect.

Word-internally long nasal vowels are represented by orthographic , as in Southwestern Ojibwe mindimooyenyag 'old women'.

The nasalized allophones of the vowels, which occur predictably preceding the nasal+fricative clusters ns, nz, and nzh are not indicated in writing, in words such as gaawiin ingikendanziin "I don't know it", jiimaanens "small boat", and oshkanzhiin "someone's fingernail(s)". In such cases the nasalization is sometimes overtly indicated by optionally writing  immediately after the vowel: moonz or mooz "moose."

In the original Double Vowel system, nasal long vowels now represented with / were written with the ogonek diacritic in some publications,  while in others they are represented by underlining the vowel. The Double Vowel system used today employing / for long nasal vowels is sometimes called "Fiero-Nichols Double Vowel system" since John Nichols popularized this convention.

The lenis obstruents are written using voiced characters:  

The fortis consonants use voiceless characters: .

The remaining consonants are written , in addition to the glottal stop , which is written .

Although the double vowel system treats the digraphs  each as single sounds, they are alphabetized as two distinct letters. The long vowel written with double symbols are treated as units and alphabetized after the corresponding short vowel. The resulting alphabetical order is:

a aa b (ch) d e g h ' i ii j k m n o oo p s t w y z

The consonant clusters that occur in many Ojibwe dialects are represented with the following sequences of characters:

mb, nd, ng, nj, nz, ns, nzh, sk, shp, sht, shk

Ottawa-Eastern Ojibwe double vowel system
A minor variant of the double vowel system is used to write the Ottawa and Eastern Ojibwe varieties spoken in Michigan and southwestern Ontario, as exemplified in a prominent dictionary. Other publications making use of the same system include a reference grammar and a collection of texts dictated by an Ottawa speaker from Walpole Island First Nation, Ontario.

The two dialects are characterized by loss of short vowels because of vowel syncope. Since vowel syncope occurs frequently in the Ottawa and Eastern Ojibwe dialects, additional consonant clusters arise.

The letter h is used for the glottal stop , which is represented in the broader Ojibwe version with the apostrophe. In Ottawa, the apostrophe is reserved for a separate function, as noted below. In a few primarily expressive words, orthographic h has the phonetic value [h]: aa haaw "OK".

The apostrophe ’  is used to distinguish primary (underlying) consonant clusters from secondary clusters that arise when the rule of syncope deletes a vowel between two consonants. For example, orthographic ng must be distinguished from n'g.

Labialization is not normally indicated in writing, but a subscript dot is used in a dictionary of Ottawa and Eastern Ojibwe to mark labialization: g̣taaji "he is afraid" and aaḳzi "he is sick".

The Ottawa-Eastern Ojibwe variant of the Double vowel system treats the digraphs sh, zh, ch as two separate letters for purposes of alphabetization.  Consequently, the alphabetical order is:

Cree-Saulteaux Roman system
The Cree-Saulteaux Roman system, also known as the Cree Standard Roman Orthography (Cree SRO), is based on the Canadian Aboriginal syllabics and is found in northern Ontario, southern Manitoba and southern Saskatchewan. Compared to the Fiero or Rhodes double vowel systems, long vowels, including , are shown with either macron or circumflex diacritic marks, depending on the community's standards. Though syncope is not a common feature with Saulteaux, the occasional vowel loss is indicated with a   Nasaled vowels are generally not marked. The resulting alphabetical order is:
' a â c ê h i î k m n o ô p s š t w y

Northern Ojibwe system
Although speakers of the dialects of Ojibwe spoken in northern Ontario most commonly write using the syllabary, an alphabetic system is also employed.

This system is used in several pedagogical grammars for the Severn Ojibwe dialect, a translation of the New Testament in both the Severn Ojibwe and the Berens River dialects, and a text collection in the Northwestern Ojibwe dialect.

The short vowels are: i, o, a

The long vowels are: ii, oo, aa, e

The consonants are:

p, c, h, k, m, n, s, sh, t, y, w

The letter  is used to represent the postalveolar affricate ; the digraph  is used to represent the postalveolar fricative .

The lenis consonants are:

p, c, k, s, sh, t

Consonant clusters of h followed by a lenis consonant correspond to fortis consonants in other dialects:

hp, hc, hk, hs, hsh, ht

The consonant clusters that occur in Ojibwe dialects that use the Northern orthography are represented with the following sequences of characters:

mp, nt, nc, nk, nz, ns, nsh, sk, shp, sht, shk

Algonquin Roman system
Unlike the other Roman systems modeled after English, the Algonquin Roman system is instead modeled after French.

Correspondence chart of the popular Roman systems
The n-dash (–) is used to mark where no equivalent is found. Also,  is used as a generic vowel indicator.

Folk spelling
Folk spelling of Anishinaabemowin is not a system per se, as it varies from person to person writing speech into script. Each writer employing folk spelling would write out the word as how the speaker theirself would form the words. Depending on whether the reference sound representation is based on English or French, a word may be represented using common reference language sound representation, thus better able to reflect the vowel or consonant value. However, since that requires the knowledge of how the speaker theirself speaks, folk spelling quickly becomes difficult to read for those individuals not familiar with the writer.

Folk spellings continue to be widely used and, in some cases, are preferred to more systematic or analytical orthographies. Prominent Ottawa author Basil Johnston has explicitly rejected it, preferring to use a form of folk spelling in which the correspondences between sounds and letters are less systematic.Johnston, Basil, 1979 Similarly, a lexicon representing Ottawa as spoken in Michigan and another based on Ottawa in Oklahoma use English-based folk spelling distinct from that employed by Johnston.Dawes, Charles, 1982

Historical Roman orthographies
Evans system
Evans continued to use his Ojibwe writing system in his work in Ontario. However, his students appear to have had conceptual difficulties working with the same alphabet for two different languages with very different sounds. Furthermore, the structure of the Ojibwe language made most words quite long when spelled with Latin letters, and Evans himself found this approach awkward. His book also noted differences in the Ojibwe dialectal field. The "default" dialect was the Ojibwemowin spoken at Rice Lake, Ontario (marked as "RL"). The other two were Credit, Ontario, (marked as "C") and areas to the west (marked as "W").

The Evans system recognized short and long vowels but did not distinguish between lenis and fortis consonants. Evans distinguished long vowels from short vowels by doubling the short vowel value. He also used three diacritics to aid the reader in pronunciation. He used a macron (¯) over a vowel or vowels to represent nasals (/Ṽ/) and diaereses (¨) over the vowel to indicate a glottal stop; if the glottal stop was final, he duplicated the vowel and put a circumflex (ˆ) over the duplicated vowel. "Gladness," for example, was written as buubenandumooen (baapinendamowin in the Fiero system).

Evans eventually abandoned his Ojibwe writing system and formulated what would eventually become the Canadian Aboriginal syllabics. His Ojibwe syllabics parsing order was based on his Romanized Ojibwe.

Baraga system
Bishop Frederic Baraga, in his years as a missionary to the Ojibwa and the Odawa, became the foremost grammarian of Anishinaabemowin during the latter half of the 19th century.

His work A Dictionary of the Otchipwe Language, explained in English is still considered the best reference regarding the Ojibwe vocabulary of western Upper Peninsula of Michigan and northern Wisconsin. In his dictionary, grammar books, and prayer book, the sound representations of Ojibwe are shown in the table below. There has also been discussion regarding if Baraga represented nasals. In his earlier editions of the dictionary, circumflex accents were used to indicate nasals (-nh / -ny-) but in his later editions, they appear instead to represent long vowels or stressed vowels, believed to be changed by the editor of his dictionary. Baraga represented pronominal prefixes separate from the word but indicated preverbs attached with a hyphen to the main word. End-of-line word breaks not at the preverb hyphen were written with a hyphen at the end of the line, followed by another hyphen at the beginning of the next line.

Algonquin systems
Jean-André Cuoq was a missionary to the Algonquin and the Iroquois. He wrote several grammar books, hymnals, a catechism, and his premier work, Lexique de la Langue Algonquine, in 1886, focusing on the form of Anishinaabemowin spoken among the southern Algonquins. His published works regarding the Algonquin language used basic sounds, without differentiating vowel lengths, but, unlike earlier works by Malhiot, he differentiated consonant strengths. Additionally, unlike Baraga, Cuoq further broke words down to their root forms and clarified ambiguously defined words found in Baraga's dictionary.

In later works using the Cuoq system, such as Dictionnaire Français-Algonquin by George Lemoine, long vowels were indicated by a circumflex  placed over the vowel, while the unstressed short vowels were indicated by a diaersis  placed over the vowel.

Ojibwe syllabicsSee Canadian Aboriginal syllabics for a more in-depth discussion of Ojibwe syllabics and related scripts.Ojibwe is also written in a non-alphabetic orthography, often called syllabics. Wesleyan clergyman James Evans devised the syllabary in 1840-1841 while serving as a missionary among speakers of Swampy Cree in Norway House in Rupert's Land (now northern Manitoba). Influences on Evans's creation of the syllabary included his prior experience with devising an alphabetic orthography for Eastern Ojibwe, his awareness of the syllabary devised for Cherokee, and his familiarity with Pitman shorthand, and Devanagari scripts.

The syllabary spread rapidly among speakers of Cree and Ojibwe and is now widely used by literate Ojibwe speakers in northern Ontario and Manitoba, with most other Ojibwe groups using alphabetically based orthographies, as discussed above.

The syllabary is conventionally presented in a chart, but different renditions may present varying amounts of detail.

The characters representing combinations of consonant plus vowel are rotated through four orientations, each representing one of the four primary vowels, . The syllabic characters are conventionally presented in a chart (see above) with characters organized into rows representing the value of the syllable onset and the columns representing vowel quality.

A glottal stop or  preceding a vowel is optionally written with a separate character , as in ᐱᒪᑕᐦᐁ pimaatahe 'is skating'.

The syllable-closing characters referred to as finals (called "terminations" by Evans, with "final" being a later terminological innovation), occur in both word-final, and, less frequently, word-internal positions.  The finals are generally superscripted, but originally were printed or handwritten mid-line. There are two distinct sets of finals in use, a Western set and an Eastern set. The Western finals are accent-like in appearance and are unrelated to the other characters. The Eastern finals occur in four different forms. The more common form, the a-position finals, uses smaller versions of the characters for syllables containing the vowel ; the less common i-position sets use either smaller versions of the characters for syllables containing the vowel  or their full height forms. Use of the i-position series is common in some communities particularly in handwriting.Fiero, Charles, 1985, p. 96 The least common are those who use a mixture of a-position, i-position, and o-position series in their smaller version as finals, dependent on the word root. The Western finals were introduced in the earliest version of the syllabary and the Eastern finals were introduced in the 1860s.

The examples in the table are cited from Neskantaga, Ontario (Lansdowne House), a community assigned to the Northwestern Ojibwe dialect.

The sound  is represented by adding a diacritic , sometimes called the w-dot', to a triangle or consonant-vowel character. Several different patterns of use occur related to the use of western or eastern finals: (a) Western, w-dot added after the character it modifies, with western finals; (b) Eastern, w-dot added before the character it modifies, with eastern finals; (c) Northern, w-dot added before the character it modifies, with western finals.

Vowel length is phonologically contrastive in Ojibwe but is frequently not indicated by syllabics writers; for example, the words aakim 'snowshoe' and akim 'count him, them!' may both be written ᐊᑭᑦ. The practice of indicating vowel length is called 'pointed syllabics' or 'pointing'. In the pointed variant, the word 'snowshoe' would be written ᐋᑭᑦ.

The fortis consonants are generally not distinguished in the common unpointed writing from the lenis ones and so both  t and  ht are written t, etc. However, some speakers place the h initial before another initial to indicate that that initial is fortis rather than lenis.

The h initial and final are also used to represent the glottal stop in most communities, but in some, ⟨ᐞ⟩(superscript i) is used as a glottal-stop letter.

Not shown in the sample table are the characters representing non-Ojibwe sounds f th l r.  All syllabics-using Ojibwe communities use p with an internal ring to represent f, typically ᕓ, ᕕ, ᕗ, ᕙ and ᕝ, and most use t with an internal ring to represent th, typically ᕞ, ᕠ, ᕤ, ᕦ and ᕪ, but variations do exist on the placement of the internal ring; in some communities where the s have transitioned to th, ᑌᐦ, ᑎᐦ, ᑐᐦ, ᑕᐦ and ᐟᐦ sequence is instead found.  However, the method of representing l and r varies much greatly across the communities using Ojibwe syllabics.

The syllabics-using communities can be classified into:
 Finals use
 Eastern A-position Finals—consonant in a-direction shown as a superscript; most common finals in use
 Eastern I-position Finals—consonant in i-direction shown as a superscript; used in some communities of Ontario and Quebec
 Eastern I-Series as Finals—consonant in i-direction shown in full-size; used in some communities of Ontario and Manitoba
 Eastern Mixed Finals—consonant in i-, o- or a-direction shown as a superscript with choice dependent upon the word's root; typically found in James Bay Cree influenced communities
 Western Finals—typically found in Saulteaux and Oji-cree(ᑊ ''p'', ᐟ ''t'', ᐠ ''k'', ᐨ ''ch'', ᒼ ''m'', ᐣ ''n'', ᐢ ''s'', ᐡ ''sh'' and ᕀ ''y'')W-dot positioning
 pre-glyph—most commonly associated with Eastern and Northern communities (ᐌ)
 post-glyph—most commonly associated with Western communities (ᐍ)
L/R representation
 independent Sigma form—shaped like Greek capital letter sigma (ᓬ for l and ᕒ for r).
 nesting Sigma form—similar to above, but nesting on the N-shape with superscripted sigma-form alone as finals
 N-shape modified form—most common form, created by an erasure of part of the N-form (ᓓ ᓕ ᓗ ᓚ ᓪ for l and ᕃ ᕆ ᕈ ᕋ ᕐ for r)
 Roman Catholic form—most often found in western communities (ᕃ ᕆ ᕊ ᕍ ᔆ for l and ᖊ ᖋ ᖌ ᖍ ᙆ for r)

Not part of the Unicode standard, thus not shown in the sample table above, is an obsolete set of syllabics form representing šp-series, or the sp-series in those communities where š have merged with s.  Originally this series looked like "Z" or "N" and had the same orientation scheme as ᔐ še, ᔑ, ši ᔓ šo and ᔕ ša.  This obsolete set has been replaced with either ᔥᐯ/ᐡᐯ špe, ᔥᐱ/ᐡᐱ špi, ᔥᐳ/ᐡᐳ špo, and ᔥᐸ/ᐡᐸ špa; or by ᐢᐯ spe, ᐢᐱ spi, ᐢᐳ spo and ᐢᐸ spa.

Alternative y ⟨ᣟ⟩ (superscripted w-dot) or ⟨ᣞ⟩ (superscripted w-ring), depending on if a medial or a final respectively, in words where w has transformed into y.  In Evans' design, the y-dot was part of the original syllabics set, but due to ease of confusion between it and the w-dot in handwritten documents, most communities abandoned the y-dot in favour of the y-cross , which is still being used among communities using Western Finals. In Moose Cree-influenced communities, the superscripted ring can also be found as a ring diacritic in words such as ᐊᐦᐸᢹ (apakway, 'cattail') instead of ᐊᐦᐸᑾᣞ or ᐊᐦᐸᑾᔾ.

Great Lakes Algonquian syllabary

The Great Lakes Algonquian syllabary is a syllabic writing system based upon the French alphabet, with letters organized into syllables.  It was used primarily by speakers of Fox, Potawatomi, and Winnebago, but there is indirect evidence of use by speakers of Southwestern Ojibwe ("Chippewa").Smith, Huron, 1932, p. 335

It has been suggested that Ottawa speakers were among the groups that used the syllabary, but supporting evidence is weak.

See also
Ojibwe language

Notes

References

 Baraga, Frederic. 1878. A Dictionary of the Otchipwe Language, explained in English.  Montréal: Beauchemin & Valois.
 Beardy, Tom. 1996. Introductory Ojibwe in Severn dialect. Parts one and two. Thunder Bay, Ontario: Native Language Instructors' program, Lakehead University. 
 Bloomfield, Leonard. 1958. Eastern Ojibwa: Grammatical sketch, texts and word list. Ann Arbor: University of Michigan Press.
 Cappel, Constance, ed. 2006. Odawa Language and Legends: Andrew J. Blackbird and Raymond Kiogima. Philadelphia: Xlibris. 
Comrie, Bernard. 2005. "Writing systems." Martin Haspelmath, Matthew Dryer, David Gile, Bernard Comrie,  eds. The world atlas of language structures, 568–570. Oxford: Oxford University Press. 
 Cuoq, Jean André. 1866. Études philologiques sur quelques langues sauvages de l'Amérique.  Montréal: Dawson.
 Cuoq, Jean André. 1886. Lexique de la Langue Algonquine.  Montréal: J. Chapleau & Fils.
 Cuoq, Jean André. 1891. Grammaire de la langue algonquine. Société royale du Canada, Mémoires 9(1): 85–114; 10(1): 41–119.
 Dawes, Charles E. 1982. Dictionary English-Ottawa Ottawa-English. No publisher given.
 Fiero, Charles. 1985. "Style Manual for Syllabics.” Barbara Burnaby, ed., Promoting Native Writing Systems in Canada, pp. 95-104. Toronto: OISE Press. 
 Furtman, Michael. 2000.  Magic on the Rocks. Birch Portage Press.
 Goddard, Ives. 1996. "Writing and reading Mesquakie (Fox)." W. Cowan, ed., Papers of the twenty-seventh Algonquian conference, pp. 117–134. Ottawa: Carleton University. 
Johnston, Basil. 1979. Ojibway language lexicon for beginners. Ottawa: Education and Cultural Support Branch, Indian and Northern Affairs.
 Johnston, Basil. 2007. Anishinaube Thesaurus. East Lansing: Michigan State University Press. 
 Kegg, Maude. 1978. Edited and transcribed by John D. Nichols. Gabekanaansing / At the End of the Trail: Memories of Chippewa Childhood in Minnesota with Texts in Ojibwe and English. Occasional Publications in Anthropology: Linguistics Series No. 4. Greeley, Colorado: Museum of Anthropology, University of Northern Colorado.
 Kegg, Maude. 1991. Edited and transcribed by John D. Nichols. Portage Lake: Memories of an Ojibwe Childhood. Edmonton: University of Alberta Press. 
 Mitchell, Mary. 1988. Eds. J. Randolph Valentine and Lisa Valentine. Introductory Ojibwe (Severn dialect), Part one. Thunder Bay: Native Language Office, Lakehead University.
 Murdoch, John. 1981. Syllabics: A successful educational innovation. MEd thesis, University of Manitoba
 Native Language Instructors' Program. Native Language Instructors' Program, Lakehead University Faculty of Education, Lakehead University. Thunder Bay, Ontario, Canada. Retrieved on March 27, 2009.
 Nichols, John. 1980. Ojibwe morphology. PhD dissertation, Harvard University.
 Nichols, John. 1984. "The composition sequence of the first Cree Hymnal." H. Christoph Wolfart, ed., Essays in Algonquian bibliography in honour of V.M. Dechene, 1-21. Winnipeg: Algonquian and Iroquoian Linguistics.
 Nichols, John. 1996. "The Cree syllabary." Peter Daniels and William Bright, eds. The world's writing systems, 599-611. New York: Oxford University Press. 
 Nichols, John and Earl Nyholm. 1979. Ojibwewi-Ikidowinan: An Ojibwe word resource book. Saint Paul, Minnesota: Minnesota Archaeological Society.
 Nichols, John D. and Earl Nyholm. 1995. A Concise Dictionary of Minnesota Ojibwe. Minneapolis: University of Minnesota Press.  
 Ningewance, Pat. 1999. Naasaab Izhi-Anishinaabebii'igeng Conference Report A Conference to Find a Common Anishinaabemowin Writing System. Toronto: Literacy and Basic Skills Section, Ontario Ministry of Education and Training. 
 O'Meara, John. 1996. "Introduction." John O'Meara, ed., ᓂᓄᑕᐣ / Ninoontaan / I can hear it: Ojibwe stories from Lansdowne House written by Cecilia Sugarhead. Edited, translated and with a glossary by John O'Meara, pp. vii-xxxiii Winnipeg: Algonquian and Iroquoian Linguistics. 
 O'Meara, John. 1996a. "Writing Anihshininiimowin (Severn Ojibwe)." Tom Beardy, Introductory Ojibwe: Parts One and Two in Severn Dialect, pp. v-xiv. Thunder Bay: Native Language Instructors' Program, Lakehead University. . Also in Intermediate Ojibwe: Parts One and Two in Severn Dialect; and Advanced Ojibwe: Parts One and Two in Severn Dialect, pp. v-xiv. Thunder Bay: Native Language Instructors' Program, Lakehead University.
 ᐅᔥᑭᒪᓯᓇᐃᑲᓐ ᑲᐊᓂᔑᓇᐯᒧᒪᑲᒃ Oshkimasina’ikan KaaAnihshinaapemoomakahk. 1988. Toronto: Canadian Bible Society. [New Testament in Latin script and Cree syllabics. Chapters in Sandy Lake Ojibwe: Luke, Acts, Philemon; other chapters in Pikangikam Ojibwe] 
 Pentland, David. 1996. "An Ottawa letter to the Algonquin chiefs at Oka." Brown, Jennifer and Elizabeth Vibert, eds., Reading beyond words: Contexts for Native history, pp. 261–279. Peterborough, ON: Broadview Press. 
Rhodes, Richard A. 1985. Eastern Ojibwa-Chippewa-Ottawa Dictionary. Berlin: Mouton de Gruyter.
Rhodes, Richard and Evelyn Todd. 1981. "Subarctic Algonquian languages." June Helm, ed., The Handbook of North American Indians, Volume 6. Subarctic, pp. 52–66. Washington, D.C.: The Smithsonian Institution. 
 Smith, Huron H. 1932. "Ethnobotany of the Ojibwe Indians." Bulletin of the Public Museum of Milwaukee 4:327-525.
 Sugarhead, Cecilia. 1996. ᓂᓄᑕᐣ / Ninoontaan / I can hear it: Ojibwe stories from Lansdowne House written by Cecilia Sugarhead. Edited, translated and with a glossary by John O'Meara. Winnipeg: Algonquian and Iroquoian Linguistics. 
Valentine, J. Randolph. 1994. Ojibwe dialect relationships. PhD dissertation, University of Texas, Austin.
Valentine, J. Randolph. 1998. Weshki-bimaadzijig ji-noondmowaad. 'That the young might hear': The stories of Andrew Medler as recorded by Leonard Bloomfield.  London, ON: The Centre for Teaching and Research of Canadian Native Languages, University of Western Ontario. 
Valentine, J. Randolph. 2001. Nishnaabemwin Reference Grammar. Toronto: University of Toronto Press. 
 Walker, Willard. 1996. "Native writing systems." Ives Goddard, ed., The Handbook of North American Indians, Volume 17. Languages, 158–184. Washington, D.C.: The Smithsonian Institution.

External links
 Ojibwe Language Society
 OLS Miinawaa — Yahoo Group extension of the Ojibwe Language Society
 Rand Valentine's introduction to Ojibwe
 Grammar, lessons, and dictionaries
 Freelang Ojibwe Dictionary — Freeware off-line dictionary, updated with additional entries annually.
 Kevin L. Callahan's An Introduction to Ojibway Culture and History
 Language Museum report for Ojibwe
 Aboriginal Languages of Canada — With data on speaker populations
 Language Geek Page on Ojibwe — Syllabary fonts and keyboard emulators are also available from this site.
 Ojibwe Toponyms
 Our Languages: Nakawē (Saskatchewan Indian Cultural Centre)
 Niizh Ikwewag — A short story in Ojibwe, originally told by Earl Nyholm, emeritus professor of Ojibwe at Bemidji State University.
 Native Languages: A Support Document for the Teaching of Language Patterns, Ojibwe and Cree
BWCAW/Quetico Park Petroglyphs
Bois Forte Petroglyphs
Ontario Parks Petroglyph finder

Canadian Aboriginal syllabics
Latin alphabets
Anishinaabe languages
Languages of the United States
Ojibwe culture

eo:Aniŝinabeka lingvo